Naomi Harriet Ward Randall (October 5, 1908 – May 17, 2001) was a Latter-day Saint songwriter and author and a leader in the Primary of the Church of Jesus Christ of Latter-day Saints (LDS Church). In 1957, Randall wrote the lyrics to "I Am a Child of God", an LDS Church hymn that was originally written as a song for children.

Randall served as a member of the general board of the Primary Association for 27 years. As a member of the board, she was asked to write a song for children that would teach them the LDS Church beliefs on the nature of a child's relationship with God. The result was "I Am a Child of God", which has been published in over 90 languages. Randall also wrote the lyrics to "When Faith Endures", which is hymn #128 in the LDS Church hymnal.

Randall was a frequent contributor to The Children's Friend and was the chair of the Primary committee that created the CTR ring. From 1970 and 1974, Randall was the first counselor to LaVern W. Parmley in the general presidency of the Primary.

On October 13, 1998, Randall was awarded a Presidential Citation by Brigham Young University president Merrill J. Bateman for her lifelong service to the children of the LDS Church.

Naomi Harriet Ward was born in North Ogden, Utah. She was married to Earl A. Randall and was the mother of one child.  Naomi Randall died due to advanced age in La Mesa, California.

Notes 

1908 births
2001 deaths
20th-century American musicians
20th-century American women musicians
American Latter Day Saint hymnwriters
American Latter Day Saint writers
American leaders of the Church of Jesus Christ of Latter-day Saints
American women hymnwriters
American women non-fiction writers
Counselors in the General Presidency of the Primary (LDS Church)
Latter Day Saints from California
Latter Day Saints from Utah
People from North Ogden, Utah
Songwriters from Utah
Writers from Ogden, Utah